Alexander McCallum (28 October 1877 – 12 July 1937) was an Australian politician. He was the Labor member for South Fremantle in the Western Australian Legislative Assembly from 1921 to 1935. He served as Minister for Works from 1924 to 1930. From 1933 to 1935 he was Deputy Premier of Western Australia and Minister for Public Works and Labour. He also represented the South Fremantle Football Club in the Western Australian National Football League (WANFL) in one match during the 1904 season.

In December of 1924 a strike instigated by the Seamen's Union. While the media viewed the Union Leader Thomas Fox with cynicism, Alex McCallum was considered a moderate around the issue who is able to see both points of view of the conflict.

References

1877 births
1937 deaths
Members of the Western Australian Legislative Assembly
South Fremantle Football Club players
Australian rules footballers from Western Australia
Australian sportsperson-politicians
Burials at Fremantle Cemetery
Australian Labor Party members of the Parliament of Western Australia